The Kennett Bros is the business name for brothers Paul Kennett, Simon Kennett and Jonathan Kennett. They have been heavily involved in mountain biking in New Zealand since 1984, and in publishing books about cycling and cyclists. They were inducted into the Mountain Bike Hall of Fame in 2018.

Activities
Paul organised the first national mountain bike race in New Zealand in 1986 – the Karapoti Classic. The Kennett Bros continued to run this annually until 2002, when they sold the event.

In 1997 they co-organised a round of the UCI Mountain Bike World Cup in Wellington.

In 1998 they started building the Wellington City Council owned Makara Peak Mountain Bike Park, which received a national recreation award in 2002 and a national conservation award in 2003.

From 2001 to 2006 the Kennett Bros coordinated a forest revegetation project at Otari-Wilton's Bush.  40,000 trees were planted over a five-year period.

The Kennett Bros helped organise the 2006 Rotorua UCI Mountain Bike & Trials World Championships.

From 2010 to 2014 the Kennett Bros were a project manager on the New Zealand Cycle Trail.

Publishing
Paul ran a national mountain bike magazine called Mountain Bike New Zealand Magazine from 1988 to 1990.

In 1991 the Kennett Bros wrote the first edition of Classic New Zealand Mountain Bike Rides, a national guidebook, which became a best seller. They produce new editions every three years (1993, 1996, 1999, 2002, 2005, 2008, 2011, 2014, 2017, 2019). In 2019 they announced that the tenth (2019) edition would be the last in the series.

In 1995 Paul launched the Mountain Bike New Zealand Web, the online home for many New Zealand mountain bikers.

In 2004 they published a history of cycling in New Zealand called RIDE: the story of cycling in New Zealand. 

From 2005 to 2019 they published a series of seven books on influential New Zealand cyclists called the New Zealand Cycling Legend Series.

Recognition
In 2018, the Kennett Brothers were inducted into the Mountain Bike Hall of Fame.

Publications
 Classic New Zealand Mountain Bike Rides (1991 to 2019) –  (tenth edition)
 RIDE: the story of cycling in New Zealand (2004) – 
 Phil O'Shea: Wizard on Wheels (New Zealand Cycling Legends 01) by Jonathan Kennett & Bronwen Wall (2005) – 
 Harry Watson: the Mile Eater (New Zealand Cycling Legends 02) by Jonathan Kennett, Bronwen Wall & Ian Gray (2006) – 
 Bill Pratney: Never say die (New Zealand Cycling Legends 03) by Jim Robinson (2007) – 
 Warwick Dalton: the Lone Eagle (New Zealand Cycling Legends 04) by John Rhodes and Jonathan Kennett (2008) – 
 Tino Tabak: Dreams & Demons of a New Zealand Cycling Legend (New Zealand Cycling Legends 05) by Jonathan Kennett (2009) – 
 Louise Sutherland: Spinning The Globe (New Zealand Cycling Legends 06) by Bronwen Wall (2010) – 
 Classic New Zealand Road Rides Jonathan Kennett and Kieran Turner (2010) – 
 The Muddy Olympians (New Zealand Cycling Legends 07) by Simon and Jonathan Kennett (2012) – 
 Classic New Zealand Cycle Trails by The Kennett Brothers (2012 to 2021) –  (fifth edition)
 Beginners Guide to Road and Track Cycling by Ian Grey and Jonathan Kennett (2015) – 
 Short Easy Bike Rides by The Kennett Brothers (2015, 2018) -  (second edition)
 Tour Aotearoa Official Guide by The Kennett Brothers (2016 to 2021) -  (fourth edition)
 Tour Aotearoa: NZs 3000 km Bikepacking Odyssey by Jonathan Kennett (2016) - 
 Explore! Aotearoa by Bronwen Wall (2017) - 
 The Swart Brothers (New Zealand Cycling Legends 08) by Russell Jones (2019) - 
 Kopiko Aotearoa Official Guide - West to East by Jonathan Kennett and Erik Westra (2020) - 
 Kopiko Aotearoa Official Guide - East to West by Jonathan Kennett and Erik Westra (2020) - 
 Bikepacking Aotearoa by The Kennett Brothers (2020, 2021) -  (second edition)

References

External links
Kennett Bros website
Mountain Bike New Zealand Web
World Mountain Bike Cup (Wellington, 1997)
Makara Peak Mountain Bike Park
Otari-Wilton's Bush
Tour Aotearoa

New Zealand male cyclists
Book publishing companies of New Zealand
New Zealand publishers (people)
Kennet Bros
Mountain biking in New Zealand
Place of birth missing (living people)
Living people
Year of birth missing (living people)
Cycling writers